The 1998 PBA Commissioner's Cup Finals was the best-of-7 basketball championship series of the 1998 Commissioner's Cup, and the conclusion of the conference's playoffs. The Alaska Milkmen and San Miguel Beermen played for the 70th championship contested by the league, this serves as a rematch of their All-Filipino series.

The Alaska Milkmen won their 9th PBA title, defeating the San Miguel Beermen for the second time in the season, winning in six games. It was the third straight crown for Alaska, which had been into the finals series in 12 of the last 13 conferences as they continued their quest for another Grandslam season.

Kenneth Duremdes won on his second back-to-back Finals MVP in Commissioner's Cup Finals.

Qualification

Series scoring summary

Games summary

Game 1

The Beer enjoyed a 10-point spread, 88-78, going into the last 4:24 of regulation play, the Milkmen came charging back and a 12-0 blast shoved them ahead, Lamont Strothers knotted the score with two free throws sending the game into overtime.

Game 2

From a measly two-point lead, 30-28, Alaska stormed on top, 42-28, 8:13 in the second quarter, In that stretch, Strothers was slapped a technical foul for shoving Lastimosa and Mike Mustre was tagged a deliberate foul for decking Devin Davis. The Milkmen maintain a 14-point spread, 54-40 at the half and stretched their lead to 20 points, 79-59 at the end of the third quarter. The Milkmen padded their advantage to 25 points, 98-73, 4:40 remaining in the contest.

Game 3

San Miguel were down by 19 points, 29-48 at halftime. The Beer rallied from a 21-point deficit and were trailing by just a point, 64-65, entering the fourth period.

Game 4

San Miguel grabbed their biggest lead of 20 points early in the third period. Strothers, Allan Caidic and Nelson Asaytono combined late in the fourth period to stop any attempt of an Alaska comeback.

Game 5

From a 40-39 halftime edge for San Miguel, the Milkmen outscored the Beer, 20-13 in the third period for a 59-53 advantage going into the final quarter. Alaska pulled away in the final six minutes, taking a 15-point spread, 88-73, and put the game beyond doubt.

Game 6

San Miguel scored the first six points of the contest when a 24-2 blast by Alaska gave them a huge 24-8 lead in the first quarter. The Milkmen went up by 21 points, 37-16, early in the second period, but the Beer rallied and tied the count for the last time at 59-all early in the fourth quarter. As the score reads 74-71 in favor of Alaska, Kenneth Duremdes spark a 6-0 run and iced the game for the Milkmen, 80-71. Kenneth Duremdes won on his second back to back Finals MVP and Alaska captures on his ninth championship title.

Rosters

Broadcast notes

References

External links
PBA official website

1998 PBA season
1998
San Miguel Beermen games
Alaska Aces (PBA) games
PBA Commissioner's Cup Finals